Lucien Lawrence "Lou" Cunningham (4 June 1889 – 23 March 1948) was an Australian farmer and politician.

Early life

Cunningham was born at Inverell, New South Wales, to a farmer, Eugene Cunningham, and his wife Mary, née Edgeworth, both born in Ireland. He was educated at Goonoowigall Public School and eventually ran the family farm. He became involved in the Australian Workers' Union.

Politics

Cunningham was president of the local branches of the No Conscription League and the Australian Labor Party, and, having failed to enter the New South Wales Legislative Assembly in 1917 via the seat of Gough, he defeated Labor defector William Webster in 1919 to take the seat of Gwydir in the Australian House of Representatives. A Catholic, Cunningham was a staunch opponent of communism. He was promoted to the executive of the party, but lost Gwydir to Aubrey Abbott of the Country Party in 1925.

Cunningham again became a farmer and married Catherine Crosby at Coogee on 3 September 1927. He attempted to regain Gwydir in 1928 but failed, but the following year regained it, largely as a result of James Scullin's influence as Prime Minister. Cunningham was nominated as Deputy Speaker in 1931, but Charles McGrath refused to resign and the move failed. Unlike many colleagues, Cunningham remained loyal to the Labor Party through its many splits, and (being tall and around 108 kg) was nicknamed "the Goonoowigall Giant" and "Australia's biggest cabinet minister". He lost his seat at the Scullin Government's landslide loss in 1931 and, although he attempted to return as a candidate for East Sydney in 1932, he was defeated by a Lang Labor candidate.

Cunningham was a staunch opponent of Jack Lang and his party, and stood for the Legislative Assembly seat of Coogee after Lang's removal as leader. Surprisingly he won in 1941, partly due to his own political skills and partly due to the invigorated Labor under William McKell. Cunningham retained the seat until his death on 23 March 1948 of a coronary occlusion; he was survived by his wife and two sons.

References

 

1889 births
1948 deaths
Australian Labor Party members of the Parliament of Australia
Members of the Australian House of Representatives
Members of the Australian House of Representatives for Gwydir
Members of the New South Wales Legislative Assembly
20th-century Australian politicians
Australian people of Irish descent
Australian farmers